Nancy Jane Tarbell is the C.C. Wang Professor of Radiation Oncology at Harvard Medical School and Massachusetts General Hospital. Previously, she was the Dean for Academic and Clinical Affairs at Harvard Medical School (2008–2019).

She was the founding director of the Mass General Office of Women's Careers as well as the Center for Faculty Development (MGH CFD). She has received the  Gold Medal from the American Society of Radiation Oncology (ASTRO) as well as the Margaret Kripke Legend Award from the University of Texas MD Anderson Cancer Center. She was elected to the Institute of Medicine of the National Academies in 2002 (now the National Academy of Medicine). In 2005, she became the C.C. Wang Professor of Radiation Oncology, at  Harvard Medical School, an endowed professorship.

Education 
Born in Hudson, MA, she attended the University of Rhode Island where she graduated with a major in psychology. She attended SUNY Upstate Medical University for  her medical degree. After medical school, she trained at the former Harvard Joint Center for Radiation Therapy in Boston where she served as Chief Resident.

Research 
Dr. Tarbell developed the pediatric radiation oncology service at Massachusetts General Hospital from 1997–2008. Prior to that, she led the pediatric radiation oncology program at Boston Children’s Hospital. She is a specialist in pediatric oncology and pediatric brain tumors and serves on the national Children’s Oncology Group Brain Tumor Committee.

Publications 
She has authored more than 250 original publications and book chapters. Her h-index according to Google Scholar is 89 with 24,652 citations (as of January 31, 2020). She  is co-editor of Pediatric Radiation Oncology, now in its 6th edition.

References

External links

Nancy J. Tarbell papers, 1984-2008 (inclusive). H MS c312. Harvard Medical Library, Francis A. Countway Library of Medicine, Boston, Mass. 

American oncologists
Women oncologists
People from Hudson, Massachusetts
Physicians from Massachusetts
American women physicians
20th-century American physicians
20th-century women physicians
21st-century American physicians
21st-century women physicians
University of Rhode Island alumni
State University of New York Upstate Medical University alumni
Harvard Medical School faculty
Massachusetts General Hospital people
Members of the National Academy of Medicine
1951 births
Living people
20th-century American women
American women academics
21st-century American women